The 1919 Cork Senior Hurling Championship was the 32nd staging of the Cork Senior Hurling Championship since its establishment by the Cork County Board in 1887. The draw for the opening round fixtures took place on 11 March 1919. The championship began on 6 April 1919 and ended on 14 September 1919.

Carrigtwohill were the defending champions, however, they were defeated by St. Finbarr's in the second round.

On 14 September 1919, St. Finbarr's won the championship following a 5-3 to 4-1 defeat of Blackrock in the final. This was their fifth championship title overall and their first title in 13 championship seasons.

Team changes

To Championship

Promoted from the Cork Intermediate Hurling Championship
 Nemo

Results

First round

Second round

Cloughduv received a bye in this round.

Semi-finals

Final

Miscellaneous

 St. Finbarr’s win their first title since 1906.

References

Cork Senior Hurling Championship
Cork Senior Hurling Championship